Antonio Abadía Beci (born 2 July 1990) is a Spanish long-distance runner. He competed in the 5000 metres at the 2016 Summer Olympics without qualifying for the final.

Competition record

Personal bests
Outdoor
1500 metres – 3:37.24 (Huelva 2016)
3000 metres – 7:48.14 (London 2017)
5000 metres – 13:12.68 (Hengelo 2016)
10,000 metres – 28:07.14 (Maia 2016)
 10 kilometres - 27:47 (Laredo 2018)
3000 metres steeplechase – 8:34.75 (Ostrava 2011)
Indoor
3000 metres – 7:46.36 (Sopot 2014)

References

1990 births
Living people
Sportspeople from Zaragoza
Spanish male long-distance runners
Spanish male middle-distance runners
Spanish male steeplechase runners
European Athletics Championships medalists
Athletes (track and field) at the 2016 Summer Olympics
Olympic athletes of Spain
Spanish Athletics Championships winners
Athletes (track and field) at the 2018 Mediterranean Games
Mediterranean Games competitors for Spain
21st-century Spanish people